Lada Togliatti may refer to one of the following sports clubs in Togliatti, Russia:

FC Lada Togliatti, a football club from Russia
FC Lada Togliatti (women), FC Lada's women team 
HC Lada Togliatti, an ice hockey club from Russia
WHC Lada Togliatti, a women's handball club from Russia